The All India Pickleball Association (AIPA) is the governing body of Pickleball in India. It functions as a nonprofit organization, providing support to other national and local pickleball organizations, and it organized the Amateur Pickleball Federation, India as its executive body to conduct pickleball tournaments in India. Established by Mr. Sunil Valavalkar in 2008, in 2015 the AIPA became a founding member of the International Federation of Pickleball (IFP) where Valavalkar serves as Vice President.

History 
All India Pickleball Association (AIPA) was founded in 2008 with the  Registrar of Companies, Govt. Of India. They were registered under the Indian Companies Act, 1956 with a status as a Society or Trust as is popularly known. To grow the popularity AIPA made number of demonstrations in and around Maharashtra and Gujarat which helped it gain popularity after which many Print and Electronic media started covering the new founded sport. This led to many workshops where the sport started picking up rapidly.
 
In the years 2009 to 2011, AIPA expanded their reach across the State of Gujarat and received participation from Railways and colleges alike. AIPA also received recognition from the then Member of Parliament, Shri. Rahul Gandhi. This was immediately followed by an affiliation with the International Federation of Pickleball, USA. In this duration they also held many District Level and Inter District State Level Tournaments in Maharashtra.
 
AIPA expanded their reach to a national level in 2012 with a demonstration game in Jaipur. More states were granted affiliation in the latter half of 2012 and the first ever All India Open Tournament was held at Mumbai in the year 2013. In this year, Pickleball was added as an official sport for Inter School Competition in Maharashtra. In 2014 many Inter District and Inter State and mini tournaments were conducted across the country. As a major milestone, Atul Edward from Mumbai won gold in the men’s doubles category at the International Pickleball Tournament held at Netherlands in 2014.
 
In May 2015, AIPA constructed its first ever dedicated Outdoor court at Andheri, a Suburban area in the City of Mumbai, State of Maharashtra. There were regular inter district tournaments held throughout the year as well as the 3rd All India Open Tournament, held at Panipat, Haryana with participation from more than 14 states across the country. The various efforts of AIPA were recognized and appreciated widely by the Global Community of Pickleball. In 2015, AIPA was included as the Founding member of International Association of Pickleball, USA, along with Spain and Canada being the other contenders. In 2015, Anish Mehta and Shanai Menta won the Bronze Medal in the Doubles Category at the International Pickleball Tournament.
 
Indian Pickleball players as Manish Rao won the Gold Medal in the Doubles Category at the USA Open Tournament in 2016. In the years 2016–2017, many local tournaments were held at recognized venues across the country, soliciting participation from various Pickleball enthusiasts. AIPA participated in many international Pickleball sporting events including the Bangkok Tournament,  at Thailand sending over 26 players from the Indian contingent. In 2017, the first Junior National Tournament and Federation Cup Championship was held at Dehradun, Uttrakhand. In August 2017, International Coach Mr. Prem Carnot visited Mumbai to conduct a workshop with over 40 Players from across the country attend the training event. In the same year, the first Indian Open Pickleball Championship was held in Mumbai, Maharashtra with over 20 International and 60 top seeded Indian players participating.
 
In 2018, AIPA organized many tournaments which received overwhelming responses. This included tournaments such as Super League, Ramesh Prabhu memorial Tournament, Senior National Open Tournament and the 2nd Indian Open Tournament. The first all Women Tournament was organized in 2019 which saw an immense enthusiasm and participation from across the country. The Jaipur Open and the Avengers Cup was also held in the same year.

Tournament 
The tournament consists of divisions organized by age and skill level for men's, women's, and mixed doubles. Men's and women's singles were played for the first District level Tournament was held at Kalyan in the State of Maharasthra, where 65 school children participated in the one day event.
 
 Men's doubles - Under 19
 Men's doubles - 50+
 Men's doubles - Advanced
 Men's singles
 Mixed doubles
 Women's Doubles
 Women's Singles

See also 
 List of pickleball organizations
 Glossary of pickleball terms

References

External links 
 All India Pickleball Association 

Pickleball organizations
Sports governing bodies in India
Sports organizations established in 2008
2008 establishments in India
Non-profit organisations based in India